Doma is a Local Government Area in Nasarawa State, Nigeria. Its headquarters are in the town of Doma.

It has an area of 2,714 km and had a population of 139,607 in the 2006 census.

The postal code of the area is 950.
Odu is the annual festival in Doma local government, farming is the occupation of most of the Alago people who are the predominant tribe in Doma.

History
The Kingdom of Doma was founded in 1232 by Andoma and lasted until 1901 when it became part of the British Protectorate of northern Nigeria.

List of Rulers of Doma

Names and Dates taken from John Stewart's African States and Rulers (2005).
 Andoma (1232 - ?)
 Aseil
 Akau (? - c. 1300)
 Akwei (c. 1300 - ?)
 Adago
 Oka (? - c. 1390)
 Okabu (c. 1390 - ?)
 Okaku (? - c. 1480)
 Aboshe (c. 1480 - c. 1500)
 Oga I (c. 1500 - ?)
 Atta I
 Anao (? - c. 1600)
 Akwe I (c. 1600 - ?)
 Aboshi
 Adra (? - c. 1700)
 Asabo (c. 1700 - ?)
 Anawo (? - c. 1800)
 Oga II (c. 1800 - ?)
 Ogu
 Atta II
 Ari (? - c. 1855)
 Akwe II (c. 1855 - ?)
 Amaku
 Atta III
 Ausu
 Agabi
 Agulu
 Agabdo (? - 1901)
 Atta IV (1901 - 1930)

References

Local Government Areas in Nasarawa State
Lists of African rulers